= Matthew 18 process =

The Matthew 18 process, the Matthew process, and a Matthew 18 process are closely intertwined ideas and practices among some adherents of Christianity, related to a discussion of conflict resolution the Gospel according to Matthew, specifically Matthew 18:15-17. The terms may use the word "process" in either (or both) of two senses:

- Principles distilled from that gospel text
- An instance of attempting to apply such principles

== Pop-cultural reference ==
In "Dear God", the third episode of the sixth season of the TV-series The Good Wife a Matthew 18 process is mentioned and conducted to settle the dispute between a farmer and a seed producer.
